Jason Edward Mewes (born June 12, 1974) is an American actor, comedian, film producer, and podcaster. He is best known for playing Jay, the vocal half of the duo Jay and Silent Bob, in longtime friend Kevin Smith's films.

Early life
Mewes was born on June 12, 1974 in Highlands, New Jersey, and grew up in a working-class neighborhood. He never knew his father, and his mother was an ex-con and a drug addict. Relates Mewes: "She used to check into hotels and take TVs and sell them... I guess it really ain't funny, but it's weird because it was so fucked up... She used to steal mail. I used to drive around with her and she'd pull up and make me reach into mailboxes. It really wasn't pleasant." Although this exposure to drugs at first served to make him averse to them, he eventually began using them after graduating from Henry Hudson Regional High School.

His best friend was future filmmaker Kevin Smith, who described Mewes this way: "[Jason]'s the kind of dude you know for five minutes and he whips his cock out. I was like, somebody should put this dude in a movie. I just wanted to see if anybody outside our group of friends finds him as funny as I do."

Career
While working toward a career in roofing, Mewes made his film debut in Smith's 1994 film Clerks as Jay. The film was a success, resulting in Mewes becoming closely identified with the role, which he also played in Mallrats (1995), Chasing Amy (1997), Dogma (1999), Jay and Silent Bob Strike Back (2001), and Clerks II (2006). He supplied Jay's voice in the short-lived Clerks: The Animated Series. He, along with Kevin Smith, performed in the films Scream 3 (2000) and Bottoms Up (2006); they appeared on the Canadian television series Degrassi: The Next Generation, in two episodes of a three-part story arc in which he and Smith film a new addition to Smith's View Askew films titled Jay and Silent Bob Go Canadian, Eh? at Degrassi Community School. They appear again on Degrassi (in a two-part episode), at the premiere of Jay and Silent Bob go Canadian, Eh? in Canada. Mewes, Smith, and Degrassi star Stacie Mistysyn made the cover of the January 29, 2005, issue of Canadian TV Guide.

In 1998, he starred as "Gary Lamb – Ground Activist" in a series of Nike commercials directed by Smith. From 2010–2012, Mewes was cast as "Jimmy the Janitor" for 26 episodes of the Canadian television series Todd and the Book of Pure Evil.

Mewes starred in the horror film Breath of Hate (2015), where he played a romantic love interest to a dysfunctional escort. Mewes co-starred in Smith's 2008 film Zack and Miri Make a Porno, in which Mewes, in a scene near the end of the film, appears fully nude.

Mewes co-hosts a weekly podcast with Smith called Jay & Silent Bob Get Old in which Mewes discusses his former drug addiction issues.

Mewes is co-executive producer on Smith's Hulu-exclusive series Spoilers with Kevin Smith.

Mewes co-produced the 2013 animated movie Jay & Silent Bob's Super Groovy Cartoon Movie with his wife Jordan Monsanto, which was based on the Bluntman and Chronic comic book that Smith wrote as a companion piece to 2001's Jay and Silent Bob Strike Back.

Mewes starred in episode 3 of the sixth season of Hawaii Five-0 as Eddie Brooks.

Mewes' directorial debut, Madness in the Method, in which he also starred, premiered August 2, 2019, in the U.S.

Personal life
Mewes married Jordan Monsanto in a civil ceremony on January 30, 2009, with a larger wedding planned later that May. Their daughter, Logan Lee, was born on April 1, 2015.

Substance abuse
Mewes has openly talked about his struggles with substance abuse, which began in his early 20s. He first began using heroin shortly after appearing in Mallrats and was soon addicted; he was under the influence while filming Chasing Amy and Dogma. Kevin Smith entered Mewes into the first of a series of drug rehabilitation clinics in 1997 after noticing Mewes would randomly fall asleep, which he initially attributed to narcolepsy. Mewes sobered up until about a week into the Dogma shoot, when he learned he could pass his urine tests by abstaining from drugs for three days beforehand and then using drugs the rest of the week. In another attempt to get clean, Mewes moved in with his mother, who gave him OxyContin to ease the withdrawal symptoms.

In 1999, Mewes was arrested in New Jersey for heroin possession. His probation sentence included community service, drug counseling, and regular court appearances in New Jersey. In late 2001, after he failed to make a court appearance, a warrant was issued for his arrest. Smith had taken Mewes in to live with him and his wife, Jennifer Schwalbach Smith, but evicted him after catching him using drugs again. During this period, Mewes stole Smith's ATM card, spent $1,100 of Smith's money, and had heroin shipped to the hotel where a press junket for Jay and Silent Bob Strike Back was being held. Smith had Mewes check into various rehab facilities, including Promises in Malibu, where his visit coincided with frequent costar Ben Affleck's stay for alcoholism. These attempts were unsuccessful for Mewes, whose problem was so severe that Smith was unable to give him a part in 2004's Jersey Girl.

Mewes continued to use drugs, and has related that he decided to turn himself in and get help after waking up on Christmas morning in 2002 to find that he had started a fire after falling asleep near a lit candle while on heroin. Estranged from Smith, Mewes returned to New Jersey, and on April 1, 2003, he surrendered himself at a Freehold, New Jersey, court and pleaded guilty to probation violation charges. He was ordered to enter a six-month rehab program. In a July 2006 interview, he reported that he was sober, and harbored no urges to drink or use drugs. He relapsed in 2009 after having surgery.

To help Mewes maintain his sobriety, Smith created the Jay & Silent Bob Get Old podcast as a "weekly intervention" to let Mewes talk through his history of substance abuse. In a May 2014 Reddit Q&A thread with fans, Mewes stated that he had been sober since July 1, 2010.

Filmography

Video games

References

Further reading

External links

 
 Interviews Askew: Jason Mewes (Interview from March 14, 1999)
 "Jay & Silent Bob Get Old Podcast" Podcast with Smith and Mewes discussing Mewes and his addiction.

1974 births
Living people
American male film actors
American male television actors
Henry Hudson Regional High School alumni
Male actors from New Jersey
People from Highlands, New Jersey
20th-century American male actors
21st-century American male actors
American people convicted of drug offenses